Bear Creek is a  tributary of the Lehigh River in the Poconos of eastern Pennsylvania in the United States, joining the Lehigh at Francis E. Walter Reservoir.

See also
List of rivers of Pennsylvania

References

Tributaries of the Lehigh River
Rivers of Pennsylvania
Pocono Mountains
Rivers of Luzerne County, Pennsylvania